Dargida rubripennis, the pink streak, is a species of moth in the family Noctuidae. It was described by Augustus Radcliffe Grote and Coleman Townsend Robinson in 1870. It is found in the eastern United States, ranging to Kansas and Texas. It is listed as threatened in the US states of Massachusetts and Connecticut. The wingspan is 32–37 mm. The forewings are yellowish-white, with dull pink streaks and shaded with dull pink at the outer margin. The hindwings are white, also shaded with dull pink. Adults are on wing from January to February and from July to October. Its preferred larval host plant is Switchgrass (Panicum virgatum).

References

Hadeninae
Moths described in 1870